Committees for the Defense of the Revolution, or CDR, are a network of neighborhood committees across Cuba. The organizations, described as the "eyes and ears of the Revolution," exist to help support local communities and report on "counter-revolutionary" activity. As of 2010, 8.4 million Cubans of the national population of 11.2 million were registered as CDR members.

History
Following the success of the Cuban Revolution, claims of activity labeled as 'counterrevolutionary' filled Havana. There existed popular desire for some form of urban-based civil defense against sabotage particularly after the mysterious explosion of the French freighter La Coubre while dockworkers unloaded ammunitions from the ship.

The final impetus for the creation of such a movement came on the evening of September 28, 1960 when bomb blasts erupted on the former steps of the Presidential Palace while Fidel Castro gave a speech.  Fidel Castro subsequently declared:“We’re going to set up a system of collective vigilance; we’re going to set up a system of revolutionary collective vigilance. And then we shall see how the lackeys of imperialism manage to operate in our midst. Because one thing is sure, we have people in all parts of the city; there’s not an apartment building in the city, not a corner, not a block, not a neighborhood, that is not amply represented here [in the audience]. In answer to the imperialist campaigns of aggression, we’re going to set up a system of revolutionary collective vigilance so that everybody will know everybody else on his block, what they do, what relationship they had with the tyranny [the Batista government], what they believe in, what people they meet, what activities they participate in. Because if they [the counterrevolutionaries] think they can stand up to the people, they’re going to be tremendously disappointed. Because we’ll confront them with a committee of revolutionary vigilance on every block... When the masses are organized there isn’t a single imperialist, or a lackey of the imperialists, or anybody who has sold out to the imperialist, who can operate”.The slogan of the CDR is, "¡En cada barrio, Revolución!" ("In every neighborhood, Revolution!"). Fidel Castro proclaimed it "a collective system of revolutionary vigilance," established "so that everybody knows who lives on every block, what they do on every block, what relations they have had with the tyranny, in what activities are they involved, and with whom they meet."

Structure 
Joining the committee is not selective; however, the top leadership of the organization is drawn from a select pool of loyalists at the discretion of the general secretary of the PCC. Each CDR subdivision has an elected president that manages their locale and is subordinate to the CDR president immediately above their. Each block president is also charged with collecting and centralizing the information about every citizen in their block, giving such information to local police, investigators for political organizations like the Union of Communist Youths or the Communist Party of Cuba or the investigators for the Department of State Security (G2). Each committee also has one responsible for Vigilance, Ideology, and Community and Service. Those tasked with vigilance write annotations on citizens, monitoring how often people go to their house and how many attend, their whereabouts, family and work history, how many packages they may be receiving or enforcing curfews. Those in charge of Ideology are tasked with spreading political material to orient the people towards the party and recording overall revolutionary moral character. Those responsible for community and service plan various activities on rest days like maintaining optimal hygienic conditions on the block.

Activities

Community services
Besides mobilizing society for the defense of the revolution and the triumph of socialism, the CDRs have also a role in national literacy and vaccination campaigns. They maintain social hygiene by eradicating the origins of transmission for certain diseases.  They popularly mobilized people for demonstrations for Elian Gonzalez, the “Five Heroes” spies, or Mariel Boatlift. The CDR is also vital for the National Civil Defense as they evacuate millions of people during hurricanes and are responsible for block clean up operations to remove debris and clear up roads, among others. 

CDR has additional responsibilities beyond monitoring individual political and moral backgrounds; these include arranging community festivals, administrating voluntary community projects, and organizing community attendance to mass rallies. Proponents further emphasize that CDRs have helped to put medical, educational, or other campaigns into national effect. They also act as centers for many who do not work in farms or factories, and hence include a large proportion of female membership. The CDRs also take an active role in vaccination campaigns, blood banks, recycling, practicing evacuations for hurricanes, and supporting the government in its fight against corruption.

CDR community centers were mobilized beginning 2020 to help respond to the ongoing COVID-19 pandemic in Cuba, although its efficacy is debated.

Surveillance and violence

CDR opponents indict Cuba's CDR system of informants with an accompanying control of individual freedom, a breakdown of the Cuban nuclear family unit, widespread human alienation, and a pervasive interpersonal mistrust, at all levels of Cuban society.

A 2006 report from Amnesty International alleged CDR involvement in repeated human rights violations that included verbal as well as physical violence. Critics contend that the CDRs are a repressive tool, giving the government a heads-up about dissident activities on the micro-local level. They further identify CDRs as "one of the lead entities responsible for the wave of repression sweeping through Cuba" most recently, the brutal beatings and detention of 75 members of the Ladies in White in Havana in 2011 and 2012. Opponents of CDRS also claim they spy on day to day activities to search for any "counter-revolutionary acts"  and claim they are an invasion of privacy and human rights.

Elizardo Sánchez, a Cuban dissident, described the CDR as "a tool for the systematic and mass violation of human rights, for ideological and repressive discrimination. They assist the police and the secret service".

See also

 Stasi
 Mass surveillance
 Unofficial collaborator in East Germany
 Colectivo (Venezuela)
 Dignity Battalions

References

External links
Official CDR−Committees for the Defense of the Revolution website— 
Recent news about the CDR— + 

Aftermath of the Cuban Revolution
Cuban intelligence agencies
Law enforcement agencies of Cuba
1960 establishments in Cuba
Organizations established in 1960
Society of Cuba